Jessica Regan (born 24 February 1982) is an Irish actress, known for portraying the role of Niamh Donoghue in the BBC soap opera Doctors. For her portrayal of the role, she won the award for Best Female Acting Performance at the 2014 RTS Midlands Awards, as well as the award for Best Newcomer at the 2015 British Soap Awards. Following her departure from Doctors, she starred in the BBC series Ill Behaviour. Regan also has numerous stage credits, having starred in productions including Blood and Gifts and Long Day's Journey into Night.

Life and career
Regan was born on 24 February 1982 in Kilkenny, and grew up in Tipperary. She attended University College Cork (UCC), since the majority of her family live in Cork. At UCC, she studied English and History. In 2004, at the age of 22, Regan made her stage debut as Charlotte in a one-woman production of The Yellow Wallpaper. She described the show as the "catalyst" for her motivation to begin acting professionally, stating: "I wasn't sure if I had the ability or the stomach for acting and The Yellow Wallpaper helped me to figure that out". Afterwards, she told her parents that she wanted to study acting at the Royal Academy of Dramatic Art (RADA) in London, to which she stated that they were "not surprised". She then borrowed the money for the train fare to Dublin from her parents in order to audition for a place at RADA, to which she was accepted.

Regan made her television debut in the Channel 4 television film Ladies and Gentlemen in 2007, after graduating from RADA. In 2007, she made a guest appearance in an episode of the BBC daytime soap opera Doctors. Then in 2008, she appeared in an episode of the BBC soap opera EastEnders as  Laura. In 2013, she appeared in another episode of Doctors. The following year, she was cast as a regular character in the soap, Dr. Niamh Donoghue. On the casting process, Regan expressed her shock at the casting call, since they wanted an Irish actress aged 30 to 33, which she found to be rare in her experience, especially with the role being regular. For her portrayal of the role, she won the award for the Best Female Acting Performance at the 2014 RTS Midlands Awards, as well as the award for Best Newcomer at the 2015 British Soap Awards. Her other nominations include the British Soap Award for Best Actress and Best On-Screen Partnership, alongside co-star Ian Midlane. In 2016, after two years on the soap, Regan announced her departure from the role. She confirmed that the decision was her own, and her character departed from the series in April 2016 after being fired from her job. In 2017, she starred in the BBC comedy-drama series Ill Behaviour, and appeared in an episode of the BBC drama Casualty the following year.

Stage

Filmography

Audio

Awards and nominations

References

External links
 

1982 births
21st-century Irish actresses
Alumni of RADA
Alumni of University College Cork
Irish radio actresses
Irish soap opera actresses
Irish stage actresses
Irish television actresses
Irish video game actresses
Living people
People from Kilkenny (city)